Laruelle is a French surname. Notable people with the surname include:
Annick Laruelle, Belgian economist
François Laruelle (born 1937), French philosopher
Marlène Laruelle (born 1972), French historian, sociologist, and political scientist
Sabine Laruelle (born 1965), Belgian politician

French-language surnames